Patrick Paul Collins (born 4 February 1985) is a professional footballer.

Six months of academy football and he earned his first of 20 England caps with the u'17's. His first game was against Portugal in which they drew 1–1, with Collins scoring England's goal.

Chances of first team football were restricted at Sunderland and although Collins (who was urgently called back from International duty with England in Egypt) was named in the first team squad for an FA cup match against Blackburn, he had to leave in order to play in a first team environment.

In 2004 Collins left Sunderland and after trials with Birmingham City and Celtic, signed for Sheffield Wednesday with the ambitions of playing in front of 25,000 people every week. In his first season Collins played 34 games and played in the playoff final at Cardiff in front of 70,000 people; coming on as a second-half substitute with the team 2-1 down to turn the game around and win 2–4. Collins went on to feature for Sheffield Wednesday following promotion to the championship but an influx of signings meant first team chances were restricted. After a loan spell at Swindon Town Collins decided to return to the North East and sign for Darlington FC in 2006.

Collins played 37 games in his first season at Darlington, captaining the side on several occasions, including a successful FA cup run ending at the hands of then premier league side Aston Villa. Unfortunately chronic calf cramps restricted him from staying fit and in his second season he went on loan to Oxford FC.

Honours

Sunderland
 PFA Scholar of the Year: 2004
Sheffield Wednesday
 Football League One play-off winner: 2005

References

External links
 

1985 births
Living people
English footballers
Sunderland A.F.C. players
Sheffield Wednesday F.C. players
Swindon Town F.C. players
Darlington F.C. players
Oxford United F.C. players
English Football League players
National League (English football) players
Association football central defenders